Amanda Jane Ormsby-Gore, Baroness Harlech (née Grieve; May 1958) is a British creative consultant and writer with a long association with the couturiers John Galliano and Karl Lagerfeld. She was named to the International Best Dressed List Hall of Fame in 1997.

Early life 
Amanda Jane Grieve was born in 1958 in north London, the daughter of Alan Grieve, a solicitor and director of the Jerwood Foundation and his first wife, Anne Dulake. She grew up in Regent's Park where one of her childhood companions was Jasper Conran.

She was educated at South Hampstead High School and Marlborough College before studying English at Somerville College, Oxford University, specialising in the work of Henry James.

Career 
Harlech worked with John Galliano during his years as an independent couturier. When Galliano joined Dior in 1996, she joined Karl Lagerfeld at Chanel. She also works as a consultant at Fendi.

Harlech has collaborated on two books – Palazzo and Sicily – and has expressed the desire to write more in the future.

In November 2011, Harlech appeared in Karl Lagerfeld's film The Tale of a Fairy and the Patricia Mazuy film Sport de Filles with Marina Hands, Bruno Ganz and Josiane Balasko.

In December 2011, Harlech curated the Krug-sponsored "Happiness" exhibition at the Royal Academy of Arts, London. The exhibition, which raised funds for the Royal Academy Schools, consisted of artworks donated by celebrities.

In May 2013, Harlech appeared in Karl Largerfeld's film Once Upon A Time, featuring Keira Knightley.

In September 2013, Harlech is seen in the Fendi film Invito Pericoloso .

In February 2014, Harlech, with Dominic Jones, started a jewellery collection called Harlot & Bones.

In 2015 Harlech curated the first and only retrospective of Karl Lagerfeld's fashion career. Featuring work from Fendi, Chloe, Chanel and his namesake brand 'Karl Lagerfeld: Modemethode' exhibited 28 March to 13 September 2015 at The Art and Exhibition Hall of the Federal Republic of Germany – in short, the Bundeskunsthalle. Creative team included - Steidl , Sam McKnight, Michel Gaubert & Chris Sutton

She made a brief appearance in the Karl Lagerfeld-directed Once and Forever, starring Kristen Stewart, Geraldine Chaplin, and Jérémie Elkaïm.

Personal life 
On May 16, 1986, she married Francis Ormsby-Gore, 6th Baron Harlech, adopting the surname 'Harlech'. The couple had two children:
 Jasset David Cody Ormsby-Gore, 7th Baron Harlech (b. 1 July 1986), studied at Central St Martins
 The Hon. Tallulah Sylvia Ormsby-Gore (b. 16 May 1988), studied at the New York Film Academy.

Harlech and her husband were divorced on 31 August 1998. She now lives in Shropshire, with a base at the Hôtel Ritz Paris for the city's fashion shows.

Titles 
 Miss Amanda Grieve (1958–1986)
 The Right Honourable The Lady Harlech (1986–1998)
 Amanda, Lady Harlech (1998–present)

References 

1958 births
Living people
British people of English descent
People educated at South Hampstead High School
People educated at Marlborough College
Alumni of Somerville College, Oxford
Writers from London
British baronesses
Amanda
British curators
Fashion influencers
21st-century English women writers